Passenger Seat may refer to:
 A place for a passenger to sit
 "Passenger Seat", a song by Stephen Speaks
 "Passenger Seat", a song by Chamillionaire
 "Passenger Seat" (SHeDAISY song), the first song on SHeDAISY's Sweet Right Here album